Machan may refer to:

People
Machan (surname)
St Machan (died 1170s), 12th-century Scottish saint
Machan Varghese (1960–2011), Malayalam film actor

Film
Machan (2008 film), 2008 Sri Lankan comedy
Machan, planned Tamil comedy film by Sakthi Chidambaram
En Aasai Machan, a 1994 Tamil language drama film directed by R. Sundarrajan
Mattupetti Machan, a 1998 Malayalam movie directed by Jose Thomas
Therku Theru Machan, a 1992 Tamil drama film directed by Manivannan

Other
Machan (state constituency), a state constituency in Sarawak, Malaysia
Machan, Iran, a village in Sistan and Baluchestan Province, Iran
An archaic name for the village of Dalserf in Lanarkshire, Scotland
A hunting blind, or bird hide

See also
 
McAnn